Gabriela Vergara Aranguren (born May 29, 1974 in Caracas, Venezuela) is an actress and model. She is best known as the 3rd runner-up in Miss Venezuela 1996.

In 1997, she started acting in many telenovelas like Destino de Mujer as Vanessa and in 2004, La Mujer en el Espejo as Barbara Montesinos de Mutti.

She gave birth to two twin girls in April, 2009. Their names are Alessandra and Emiliana.

Filmography

Television 
Juego de mentiras (2023)
The Other Side Of The Wall (2018) as Paula Duarte
El Comandante (2017) as Marisabel Rodríguez de Chávez
Las Amazonas (2016) as Debórah Piñero Villarreol de Santos / Eugenia Villarroel (Lead Antagonist)
Quererte Así (2012) as Marisela Santos / Isadora
Cielo Rojo (2011) as Aleida Ramos (Villain)
Prófugas del Destino (2010) as Lola (Main Protagonist)
Mujer Comprada (2009) as Laura
Secretos del Alma (2008) as Denisse Junot
Amas de Casa Desesperadas (2008) as Edie Britt
Puras Joyitas (2007) as La Chica
Seguro y Urgente (2006–2007) as Usmail Irureta
Decisiones (2006–2007) as Erika Pardo
El amor no tiene precio (2005) as Ivana
La Tormenta (2005)
La mujer en el espejo (2004) as Barbara Montesinos de Mutti
Belinda (2004) as Cristina and Belinda Romero
La Hija del Jardinero (2003) as Jennifer de la Vega
Trapos Íntimos (2002) as Lucia Lobo
Mambo y Candela (2002)
Felina (2001) as Daniela
Toda Mujer (1999) as Manuela Mendoza Castillo
El País de las mujeres (1998) as Almendra Sanchez
Destino de Mujer (1997) as Vanessa

Film 
 Recién cazado (2009) as Alexa
 13 Segundos (2007) as Claudia

References

External links
 
 Gabriela Vergara  (en Terra Networks) Spanish
 Biografía de Gabriela Vergara (en RCTV) Spanish
 Biografía de Gabriela Vergara (en Biosstars) Spanish

Living people
1974 births
Actresses from Caracas
Venezuelan film actresses
Venezuelan telenovela actresses
Venezuelan female models
Venezuelan people of Basque descent